Robert Eziakor (born 19 October 1986 in Onitsha, Anambra State, Nigeria) is a Nigerian head coach and former footballer.

Career
Playing for a host of Singaporean minor league sides, Eziakor signed for Hougang United FC of Singapore's top division in 2013 and was handed the number 20. Registering the most goals for his team in pre-season, he formed a good strike partnership with Guinean Mamadou Diallo, aiming to be on the top scorers charts by the end of the season. During an interview, Eziakor maintained that it was difficult for him to get back into shape for professional football since he was less fit from plying his trade with semi-pro clubs.

The forward has stated that he has enjoyed the vehemence and support of the Hougang HOOLS, his team's fan club during his time there.

References

Nigerian footballers
Nigerian expatriate footballers
Nigerian football managers
Association football forwards
Living people
1986 births
Expatriate footballers in Singapore
Singapore Premier League players
Hougang United FC players
Sportspeople from Onitsha